Giselle Tavera Madera (born July 14, 1993), known professionally as Giselle Tavera, is a Dominican singer.

Early life 
Tavera was born in Esperanza, Dominican Republic, and later immigrated to Cherry Hill, New Jersey, at the age of seven. Tavera states that she grew up surrounded by Dominican and Mexican cultures.

Career 
Tavera sings in both English and Spanish. Five of her songs were ranked on [[Billboard charts|Billboard'''s Tropical Airplay chart]]. Examples of her songs include a bachata version of "All I Want for Christmas Is You and a cover of Cyndi Lauper's "Time After Time". Her album Somos Más'' which has bilingual songs.

In 2013, Tavera sang "The Star-Spangled Banner" for a Philadelphia Eagles game. In preparation for an album, Tavera recorded songs with Tito Nieves and Luis Vargas. At the 2017 Golden Latin Awards in Pennsylvania, Tavera performed a collection of bachata songs dedicated to Puerto Rican singer Sophy Hernández.

Selected discography

Awards and nominations 

|-
| 2015
| Giselle Tavera
| Tropical Female Artist (Premio Lo Nuestro 2015)
| 
|-
| 2017
| Giselle Tavera
| Urban Batacha (Premio Latino Edición Urbana)
|

References 

1993 births
Living people
American people of Dominican Republic descent
American bachata musicians
American women pop singers
21st-century Dominican Republic women singers
Bachata musicians
Hispanic and Latino American musicians
Spanish-language singers of the United States
People from Cherry Hill, New Jersey
People from Valverde Province
21st-century American women singers
21st-century American singers
Hispanic and Latino American women singers
Women in Latin music